{{safesubst:#invoke:RfD||2=Jan Huygen van Linschoten, Market of Goa, Itinerario|month = February
|day = 18
|year = 2023
|time = 01:43
|timestamp = 20230218014320

|content=
REDIRECT Market of Goa (Van Doetecum)

}}